Ander Guevara Lajo (born 7 July 1997) is a Spanish professional footballer who plays for Real Sociedad as a midfielder.

Club career
Born in Vitoria-Gasteiz, Álava, Basque Country, Guevara joined Real Sociedad's youth setup in 2012, from Deportivo Alavés. He was promoted to the farm team ahead of the 2015–16 season, and made his debut during the campaign in Tercera División.

Guevara made his debut with the reserves on 1 October 2016, coming on as a second-half substitute in a 1–2 Segunda División B home loss against CF Fuenlabrada. The following 17 June, he renewed his contract until 2020 and was definitely promoted to the B-side.

Guevara made his first team debut on 26 October 2017, replacing fellow youth graduate Rubén Pardo in a 1–0 away win against Lleida Esportiu, for the season's Copa del Rey. He made his La Liga debut on 15 March 2019, starting in a 1–1 home draw against Levante UD.

On 7 June 2019, Guevara renewed his contract until 2024, being definitely promoted to the main squad two days later.

International career
Guevara has played for the unofficial Basque Country team, making his debut against Costa Rica in November 2020.

Career statistics

Club

Honours

Club 
Real Sociedad

 Copa del Rey: 2019–20

References

External links
Profile at the Real Sociedad website

1997 births
Living people
Footballers from Vitoria-Gasteiz
Spanish footballers
Association football midfielders
La Liga players
Segunda División B players
Tercera División players
Real Sociedad C footballers
Real Sociedad B footballers
Real Sociedad footballers
Basque Country international footballers